Jeff Stryker (born Charles Casper Peyton, August 21, 1962) is an American porn star who has starred in bisexual, gay, and straight adult films. He lives in California.

Early life
Jeff Stryker grew up in Springfield, Illinois. His father was a car salesman and his mother was a nurse. At age 13, he was sent to military school by his parents, who got a divorce while he was away.

Pre-film career
Jeff Stryker worked as a stripper and delivered balloon-o-grams before a local photographer sent shots of him to gay adult film director John Travis in California.

Film career and sexuality
Stryker is primarily known as a performer in gay pornography films, although Jamie Loves Jeff was one of the biggest selling heterosexual adult movies of all time for its producer, Vivid Entertainment. He describes himself (in a somewhat joking fashion) as sexually "universal". He has also said, "I don’t define myself as anything."

He also tried acting, starring in a 1989 Italian-produced horror film called After Death (Revenge of the Zombies), in which he was credited as Chuck Peyton. Later in the American DVD release, the name Jeff Stryker was used as well. A trailer interview was added with Stryker describing the experience he had while shooting this movie in Manila. Stryker also starred in the short film  by German cult director Rosa von Praunheim Can I Be Your Bratwurst, Please?  Stryker also appeared in a 1995 German television movie The Black Curse starring James Brolin, as well as the 1988 Italian feature Dirty Love.

Awards and tributes
 AVN Hall of Fame inductee
 GayVN Hall of Fame inductee
 2000 Grabby Wall of Fame inductee
 2004 Hustler Porn Walk of Fame
 1986 XRCO Best Actor (Gay) 
 Stryker was featured in a 1991 portrait by artists Pierre et Gilles.

Merchandising
The Jeff Stryker Cock and Balls, a dildo fashioned from a cast of his penis, is widely sold in sex stores. The dildo was academically analyzed in a paper presented at the 1995 Bowling Green State University Conference in Cultural Studies: Lesbian Pornography and Transformation: Foucault, Bourdieu, and de Certeau Make Sense of the Jeff Stryker Dildo, by Mary T. Conway, then a graduate student at Temple University. The sex toy is notable not only for being popular, but also as Stryker and the manufacturer of the item litigated for the rights to its likeness as part of Stryker's intellectual property. The case eventually reached a mutually acceptable resolution (see ). In a 1999 Salon article written by Jeff Stryker, a New York journalist and the porn actor's namesake, the dildo is even described as an object of higher culture. It was mentioned in Allan Gurganus' 1997 novel Plays Well with Others, where the novel's narrator cleans up a closet filled with dildos, the premium find being "a Jeff Stryker, a monster, but somehow Roman in its genial fluted civic beauty."

Stryker has released a country music album titled Wild Buck. In his pornographic video Bigger Than Life, he performed a rock song of the same name.

Reaction from other celebrities
 Filmmaker and author John Waters called Jeff Stryker “the Cary Grant of porno.”
 American comedian Margaret Cho's routines involve her love for his films. In her show, Assassin, she discusses in detail the many places one can use the dildo. Stryker had given Cho his commercially produced action figure.
 In her autobiography, Traci Lords describes him as “handsome but rather dumb looking” after he gave her scornful looks backstage during a Century City Civic Center Thierry Mugler Fashion show.

Legal battles
Stryker later sued Health Devices Inc. and California Publishers Liquidating Corp. for over $1 million for breach of contract and piracy when they sold a bootleg dildo of his genitals without paying him sufficiently. The case was heard before a judge in Los Angeles, who eventually brokered a deal whereby the case was dismissed upon payment of $25,000 to Stryker and the return and right to reproduce all items which Stryker endorsed.

Stryker has had arguments with Kulak's Woodshed, a folk-music nightclub, that is next door to his office. He claims that the club causes disturbance normally associated with large late-night urban venues: noise, drugs, unruly patrons, vandalism, graffiti, public urination and parking headaches. James Britton, who operates a floor covering business on the other side of the club, also complains that the club has damaged his business. In January 2009, the L.A. Weekly reported that Stryker blamed the nightclub for preventing him from completing his autobiography, as the noise and crowds disturbed his concentration. “(My writing has) been put on perpetual hold until I can get myself back together,” he told the newspaper. “I got a $25,000 advance on (the book) but could never complete it.”

But Paul Kulak counter claims (according to the L.A. Weekly) that Stryker has made threats to him and the club's customers: “He constantly reminds me he’s a firearms expert and will hide behind his back door when I dump the trash. Once, he started making mechanical gun clicks. I could see he had a pistol in his hand as he was dry-firing it... I’m willing to risk my life to keep this [club] going.” Stryker responded to Kulak's claim and was quoted as saying, "That guy is so out there!"

Stage shows
Stryker appeared in A Sophisticated Evening with Jeff Stryker in Los Angeles, Summer 2006 and in Provincetown, Massachusetts, Summer 2007. The show was produced by comedy writer Bruce Vilanch. In the show, Stryker performed a comic monologue about his life and adventures in adult films, conducted a "porn acting demo" comedy skit with an audience member, and danced in a nude finale where he greeted the audience.

From 1999 through 2001, Stryker performed in a stage show called Hard Time, a comedy send-up of gay porn prison films. In the finale, Stryker danced nude. After the play, Stryker met with the audience at the door. The show toured several cities including New York, San Francisco, Chicago, and Houston.

Selected filmography

Gay and solo
 Jeff Stryker Does Hard Time 2001
 Stryker 2000 solo/masturbation
 Jeff Stryker’s Underground 1997
 Santa’s Cummin’! 1996 solo/masturbation
 J.S. Big Time 1995
 The Tease 1994 solo/masturbation
 How to Enlarge Your Penis 1993 solo/masturbation
 10 Plus 1992 solo/masturbation
 10 Plus Volume 2 1992 solo/masturbation
 Busted 1991
 In Hot Pursuit 1991
 Powertool 2: Breaking Out
 Just You & Me 1990 solo/masturbation
 On the Rocks 1990
 Stryker’s Best: Powerful Sex 1989
 The Look 1987
 Stryker Force 1987
 In Hot Pursuit 1987
  2 1987
 Powertool 1986
 Bigger Than Life  1986

Straight
 Stryker/Ryker in "RAW"
 Jamie Loves Jeff 
 Cummin' Together 
 Dreaming of You 
 Heiress 
 Jamie Loves Jeff 2
 Cyberstud" 
 Jeff Stryker's Favorite Sexual Positions 1992
 Milk and Honey 
 Take Me The Rebel 
 The Giant 
 In Your Wildest DreamsBisexual
 The Switch Is On 1987
 Every Which Way 1990

Other/non-porn
 Can I Be Your Bratwurst, Please? 1999 comedy short by Rosa von Praunheim
 After Death (also known as Zombie 4: After Death) 1989
 Dirty Love 1988
 Circus of Books, a 2019 documentary by Rachel Mason, features an interview with Stryker. The film focuses on the Los Angeles bookstores and porn shops Circus of Books, operated by Karen Mason and Barry Mason. Stryker worked with the Masons and did book and video signings at the shop.

 

See also
 List of male performers in gay porn films

References

External links

 
 
 
 
 "Jeff Stryker: Porn's Enigmatic Star", December 2013 interview on The Rialto Report "Mr. Big Stuff", 1999 interview with MetroActive''
 Jeff Stryker profile at Maleflixxx Television
   

1962 births
Living people
American male pornographic film actors
American pornographic film directors
American actors in gay pornographic films
Directors of gay pornographic films
American LGBT artists
American LGBT actors
People from Carmi, Illinois
People from Springfield, Illinois